Central Bus Station, popularly known as Central Bus Stand or Arignar Anna Moffusil Bus Stand is one of the main bus terminus of Kumbakonam, a town in Thanjavur district of Tamil Nadu, India. The bus terminus is classified as "A" category bus station. The other bus stand is Town bus stand.

The prominent Mahamaham tank is 3 km away from the Central Bus Station. There are two bus stands one for mofussil services and one for town services opposite to moffusil bus stand. In future Kumbakonam need a Integrated bus stand at Chennai bypass road considering the four laning of Thanjavur Kumbakonam Vikravandi NH 36. The present bus stand is well inside the town as it was proposed in 1980s and started to function from 1989.

Services

Around 1,500 Bus trips are start, end or passes through the Bus terminus every day.

Routes

Connections

See also

 Kumbakonam railway station
 Transport in Thanjavur
 Transport in Tamil Nadu

References

Bus stations in Tamil Nadu